The 1963–64 season was Cardiff City F.C.'s 37th season in the Football League. They competed in the 22-team Division Two, then the second tier of English football, finishing fifteenth.

Players

League standings

Results by round

Fixtures and results

Second Division

League Cup

FA Cup

Welsh Cup

See also
Cardiff City F.C. seasons

References

Welsh Football Data Archive

Cardiff City F.C. seasons
Association football clubs 1963–64 season
Card